Ministry of Labour and Social Affairs of Iran (Vâzart-e Kaz-e vâ Amvâz-e Ajtema'i), was the main organ of Iranian Government in charge of the regulation and implementation of policies applicable to labour and social affairs.

History
After the Second World War and its social and economic effects, disagreements and strikes increased in different parts of the country, these pressures made the government of prime minister Ahmad Qavam to establish an independent office as "General Office of Labour" under the "Ministry of Profession and Art" in 1944. It couldn't solve the existed problems, so they came to a conclusion that in order to overcome the problems, they should pass a law for labour regulations. The first Labour law was approved by cabinet (but not the parliament) on May 18, 1946, in a special situation where the labour strikes was going to take a political aspect. The inability of "General Office of Labour" to overcome the difficulties and other reasons, resulted in the formation of the "Ministry of Labour and Advertisement" on August 4, 1946. Later it became "Ministry of Labor and Social Affairs", and after the Iranian 1979 revolution, many related organizations came under it. Ministry was dissolved on 3 August 2011.

List of Ministers
Pahlavi era:
Mozaffar Firuz was the first labour minister of Iran in Qavam cabinet. Amongst other ministers of the same post during the Pahlavi era were Ahmad Aramesh in the cabinet led by Ahmad Qavam, Ibrahim Alemi in the cabinet of Mohammad Mosaddegh and Manuchehr Azmun in Amir-Abbas Hoveida cabinet.

After the Iranian revolution the following served in the post:
Dariush Forouhar
Ali Espahbodi
Mohammad Reza Nematzadeh
Mohammad Mir-Mohammad Sadeghi
Ahmad Tavakkoli
Abolghasem Sarhadizadeh
Hossein Kamali
Safdar Hosseini
Nasser Khaleghi
Mohammad Jahromi
Reza Sheykholeslam

Deputies
The ministry consists of six deputies as: 
Deputy for Coordination & International affairs
Deputy for Labour Relations
Deputu for Planning & Employment Policies
Deputy for Social & Cultural affairs
Deputy for Legal & Parliamentary affairs
Deputy for Patronage

See also
 Iranian labor law
 Iranian Labour News Agency
 Cabinet of Iran
 Government of Iran
Ministry of Welfare and Social Security (Iran)

References

External links
Official Website

Iran
Iran
Iran, Labour and Social Affairs
2011 disestablishments in Iran
1950 establishments in Iran
Labour and Social Affairs